William Robert Picken (7 June 1956 – 23 July 2022) was an Australian rules footballer who played for the Collingwood Football Club and the Sydney Swans in the Victorian Football League (VFL). Picken was still at school when he arrived at Collingwood in 1974 from Macarthur as a forward, but he developed into a talented centre-half back.

Despite playing in four losing grand finals, Picken maintained his reputation as a finals performer and was recognised for his contributions when he was named in the Collingwood Team of the Century. A notable example of his exploits was a spectacular mark in the 1979 grand final.

Picken was a dashing defender, capable of taking a spectacular mark and dashing off with the ball turning defence into attack in an instant.

When Picken controversially moved to the Swans in 1984, he was hit by a succession of injuries for the first time in his career. He later returned to Victoria Park to captain-coach the reserves.

Picken is the father of former Western Bulldogs player, Liam Picken and former Brisbane Lions player Marcus Picken, and also the uncle of former Brisbane Lions captain Jonathan Brown.

He also played first-grade cricket for Collingwood Cricket Club, and had the dubious distinction of being the first first-grade cricketer ever to be suspended by the Victorian Cricket Association for striking an opponent during a cricket match.

References

External links

Bill Picken at Collingwood Forever

1956 births
2022 deaths
Collingwood Football Club players
Sydney Swans players
Victorian State of Origin players
Heywood Football Club players
Glenorchy Football Club players
Glenorchy Football Club coaches
Clarence Football Club coaches
Clarence Football Club players
Copeland Trophy winners
People educated at Melbourne High School
Australian rules footballers from Victoria (Australia)
Australian cricketers
Cricketers from Victoria (Australia)